The Northern California Band Association (NCBA) provides judging for marching band competitions in Northern/Central California and northern Nevada. These competitions may include field, street, concert, jazz, and percussion venues.

The NCBA was established in 1990-1991 by music directors in Northern California to provide an organization that could judge the many diverse marching band competitions that were being run by independent organizations. The goal was to provide consistency and a slate of judges. Since its inception the organization has grown to almost 200 members, including overseas members.

References

External links 
 Northern California Band Association website
 NCBA Calendar of Events

Marching band competitions
Organizations established in 1990
Music organizations based in the United States